Following is a list of dams and reservoirs in North Dakota.

All major dams are linked below.

Dams and reservoirs in North Dakota 

This list is incomplete.  You can help Wikipedia by expanding it.

Baldhill Dam, Lake Ashtabula, Sheyenne River, United States Army Corps of Engineers
Beaver Creek Dam, seasonal flood control reservoir, Steele County
Bowman-Haley Dam, Bowman-Haley Reservoir, USACE
Cottonwood Creek Dam 3, Lake LaMoure, city of LaMoure
Lake Darling Dam, Lake Darling, Souris River, United States Fish and Wildlife Service
Dec Lacs#2, part of the Des Lacs National Wildlife Refuge Complex, United States Fish and Wildlife Service
Dickinson Dam, Edward Arthur Patterson Lake, United States Bureau of Reclamation
Garrison Dam, Lake Sakakawea, USACE
Heart Butte Dam, Lake Tschida, USBR
Jamestown Dam, Jamestown Reservoir, USBR
Oahe Dam, Lake Oahe (extending into North Dakota from South Dakota), USACE
Pipestem Dam, Pipestem Lake, USACE
Renwick Dam, Lake Renwick, Pembina County Water Resource District

Drayton dam in Drayton, ND – Drayton County
Riverside dam in Grand Forks, ND - Grand Forks County
North dam in Fargo, ND - Cass County
Midtown dam in Fargo, ND - Cass County
South dam in Fargo, ND - Cass County
Rock dam by Hickson, ND - Cass County
Rock dam by Christine, ND - Richland County 
Kidder by Wahpeton, ND - Richland County

References 

North Dakota
Dams
Dams